George Nicholas Eckert (July 4, 1802 – June 28, 1865) was an American politician from Pennsylvania who served as a Whig member of the U.S. House of Representatives for Pennsylvania's 14th congressional district from 1847 to 1849. He also served as the 7th Director of the United States Mint from 1851 to 1853.

Early life and education
George N. Eckert was born in Womelsdorf, Pennsylvania.  He graduated from the medical department of the University of Pennsylvania in Philadelphia in 1824 and commenced practice in Reading, Pennsylvania.  He was one of the organizers of Berks County Medical Society in 1824. He moved to Pine Grove, Schuylkill County, Pennsylvania, and engaged in the coal and iron trade.

Political career
Eckert was elected as a Whig to the Thirtieth Congress.  He was appointed Director of the United States Mint at Philadelphia by President Millard Fillmore and served from June 1851 to June 6, 1853.  He died in Philadelphia in 1865 and was interred in Laurel Hill Cemetery.

References

External links
 The Political Graveyard

1802 births
1865 deaths
19th-century American physicians
19th-century American politicians
Burials at Laurel Hill Cemetery (Philadelphia)
Directors of the United States Mint
Fillmore administration personnel
Pierce administration personnel
People from Berks County, Pennsylvania
Perelman School of Medicine at the University of Pennsylvania alumni
Whig Party members of the United States House of Representatives from Pennsylvania